Talajić is a Croatian surname. Notable people with the surname include:

Dalibor Talajić, Croatian comic book artist
Dragan Talajić, Croatian football manager and former player
Mark Talajic, former Australian footballer

Croatian surnames
Slavic-language surnames
Patronymic surnames